Norah Morahan O'Donnell (born January 23, 1974) is an American television journalist who is currently anchor of the CBS Evening News, a correspondent for 60 Minutes, and current host of Person to Person. She has worked with several mainstream media outlets throughout her career, including as former co-anchor of CBS This Morning, Chief White House Correspondent for CBS News, and a substitute host for CBS's Sunday morning show Face the Nation.

Early life and education
O'Donnell was born in Washington, D.C., the daughter of Noreen Bernadette (O'Kane) and Francis Lawrence O'Donnell, a  medical doctor and  US Army officer. Her parents are both of Irish descent, with roots in Derry, Belfast, and Donegal (meaning she is descended from both sides of the Irish Border). Three of her grandparents were immigrants, and her maternal grandfather lived in the U.S. illegally for 16 years. When Norah was three, her family moved to San Antonio, Texas. When she was 10, the family spent two years in Seoul, living in Yongsan Garrison as her father was assigned to work there.  While an elementary student, she started her career in broadcasting by giving videotaped English lessons for the Korean Educational Development Institute.  The family moved back to San Antonio, where she attended Douglas MacArthur High School, from which she graduated in 1991. She then went on to attend Georgetown University, where she graduated in 1995 with a Bachelor of Arts degree in philosophy and a Master of Arts degree in liberal studies in 2003.

Career

O'Donnell worked as a staff writer for Roll Call, where she covered Congress.  She spent twelve years of her career at the NBC networks. A commentator for the Today Show, Chief Washington Correspondent for MSNBC, and a White House correspondent for NBC News, O'Donnell was also a contributing anchor for MSNBC Live and an anchor on Weekend Today. O'Donnell reported for various NBC News broadcasts, including NBC Nightly News, The Today Show, Dateline NBC, and MSNBC. O'Donnell filled in for Chris Matthews as host of Hardball with Chris Matthews and was a regular pundit for The Chris Matthews Show.

Since joining CBS, she has served as anchor in several of its highest-rated shows, filling in for Scott Pelley on the CBS Evening News multiple times, the first being October 10, 2011. She was chief White House correspondent in 2011 and 2012, and became a co-anchor on CBS This Morning in fall of 2012. On May 6, 2019, Susan Zirinsky, president of CBS News, announced that O'Donnell had been named anchor and managing editor of the CBS Evening News beginning on July 15, 2019, will also be the lead anchor of political events for the network and continue as a contributing correspondent for 60 Minutes. She becomes the third woman after Connie Chung and Katie Couric to serve as the program's weeknight anchor. Her last broadcast of CBS This Morning was on May 16, 2019. On April 8, 2022, O'Donnell had extended her contract with CBS News to remain as anchor of CBS Evening News, through the 2024 election and afterward.

Career timeline
 1984: Language instructor for the Korean Educational Development Institute
 1994-1996: Panelist, Youngbloods (show) National Empowerment Television 
 1999–2011: NBC News/MSNBC
 1999–2011: Washington Bureau correspondent 
 1999–2011: Weekend Today rotating news anchor
 1999–2011: MSNBC Live fill-in anchor
 2000-2011: Dateline NBC contributing correspondent
 2003–2011: NBC News White House correspondent 
 2005–2011: MSNBC Chief White House correspondent
 2011–present: CBS News
 2011–2012: Chief White House correspondent
 2011– May 2019: CBS Evening News fill-in anchor
 September 2012– May 2019: CBS This Morning co-anchor
 2011–present: Face the Nation fill-in host and correspondent
2013–present: 60 Minutes correspondent
2019–present: CBS Evening News anchor and managing editor
2019–present: CBS Overnight News anchor

Personal life

Family
O'Donnell lives in Washington, D.C., and New York City's Upper West Side neighborhood with her husband, restaurateur Geoff Tracy (owner of D.C. restaurant Chef Geoff's), whom she married in June 2001. They met while attending Georgetown together. On May 20, 2007, O'Donnell and Tracy became the parents of twins, whom they named Grace and Henry. Their third child, daughter Riley Norah Tracy, was born on July 5, 2008; O'Donnell noted that her daughter's first name had been suggested by Tim Russert, who died three weeks prior to Riley's birth. O'Donnell and Tracy made a cookbook for parents titled Baby Love: Healthy, Easy, Delicious Meals for Your Baby and Toddler, released on August 31, 2010.

Health
In fall 2016, O'Donnell was diagnosed with melanoma 'in situ', meaning the cancer was contained to the epidermis and had not yet spread to the dermis and metastasized. She underwent surgery soon after where a "three-inch-long piece of skin from the upper left corner of [her] back" was excised. She later stated that she now gets regular skin check-ups "every three to four months" and "multiple skin biopsies" due to her high risk. In the years since her diagnosis O'Donnell has become a skin care advocate, encouraging others, especially women, to get regular dermatological check-ups and take better care of their skin by practicing good skin care routines such as using sunscreen. She talked openly about her diagnosis with her dermatologist live on CBS This Morning in 2017.

Awards and recognition 
Washingtonian Magazine has named O'Donnell as one of Washington's 100 most powerful women. O'Donnell has also been named to Irish American Magazine's 2000 "Top 100 Irish Americans" list.

O'Donnell won the Sigma Delta Chi Award for Breaking News Coverage for the Dateline NBC story "DC In Crisis," which aired on the night of September 11, 2001.

She won an Emmy as part of NBC News' Election Night coverage team in 2008 for the category Outstanding Live Coverage of a Breaking News Story – Long Form. She was also awarded an Emmy in 2018 for her six-month investigation and report on "Sexual Assault in the Air Force Academy" for CBS This Morning in the category Outstanding Investigative Report in a Newscast. That same year, this story was given an honorable mention from the White House Correspondents' Association for the Edgar Allan Poe Award.

References

External links 
 Official CBS News bio
 

American television reporters and correspondents
American television news anchors
1974 births
Living people
CBS News people
NBC News people
American women television journalists
Douglas MacArthur High School (San Antonio) alumni
Georgetown University alumni
American people of Irish descent
People from San Antonio
Journalists from Washington, D.C.
20th-century American journalists
21st-century American journalists
Journalists from Texas
20th-century American women
21st-century American women